Callopistria cordata, the silver-spotted fern moth, is a species of moth in the family Noctuidae (the owlet moths). It is found in North America.

The MONA or Hodges number for Callopistria cordata is 9633.

References

Further reading

External links

 

Noctuidae
Articles created by Qbugbot
Moths described in 1825